Jan Berger (born 27 November 1955 in Prague) is a Czech former football midfielder and was most recently the manager of Slavoj Vyšehrad.

Berger played in Czechoslovakia for Dukla Prague and Sparta Prague, winning three league titles in total. He also played internationally, winning gold with Czechoslovakia in the 1980 Olympic football competition and bronze in the UEFA European Championship held in the same year.

Club career
In Czechoslovakia, Berger played for Dukla Prague, winning the league title in 1979 and scoring a total of six goals between 1978 and 1980. He transferred to Sparta Prague in 1980 after the 1980 Olympic football tournament. He was named Czechoslovak Footballer of the Year in 1984. While a Sparta player, Berger won two more league titles, before leaving in 1986 to continue his career in Switzerland.

International career
Berger played 30 matches for the Czechoslovakia national football team. He won a bronze medal in the 1980 UEFA European Football Championship and was a participant in the 1982 FIFA World Cup.

Management career
Berger returned to Dukla Prague in 2005, overseeing the second half of the 2004–05 league campaign for the club in the Prague Championship. The club finished the season second. He remained at the club, but left mid-way through the 2005–06 season with the club eventually finishing in 13th position.

Personal life
Berger is the uncle of Patrik Berger who represented the Czech Republic. He is the father of footballer Tomáš Berger.

References

Cited texts

External links
 
 Jan Berger: Real mi nabízel milion dolarů
 MILION DOLARŮ ZA PODPIS
 Padesátník Berger odmítl frčky i Real

1955 births
Living people
Footballers from Prague
Czech footballers
Czechoslovak footballers
Czech football managers
Footballers at the 1980 Summer Olympics
Olympic footballers of Czechoslovakia
Olympic gold medalists for Czechoslovakia
UEFA Euro 1980 players
1982 FIFA World Cup players
FC Viktoria Plzeň players
AC Sparta Prague players
Dukla Prague footballers
FC Zürich players
Czechoslovakia international footballers
Olympic medalists in football
Czechoslovak expatriate footballers
Expatriate footballers in Switzerland
Czechoslovak expatriate sportspeople in Switzerland
Medalists at the 1980 Summer Olympics
Association football midfielders
FK Dukla Prague managers
FC Slavoj Vyšehrad managers